Warren Defever (first name often spelled Warn; born April 30, 1969) is a musician and producer, originally from Livonia, Michigan, and now based in Detroit. He is most known for his chameleonic project His Name Is Alive, though he is active in numerous other circles. He produced, engineered, and/or remixed recordings by Iggy and the Stooges, Easy Action, Low, Ida, Michael Hurley,  Califone, Yoko Ono, Thurston Moore, the Gories, the Go, Nomo, Saturday Looks Good to Me, Ethan Daniel Davidson, Faruq Z. Bey, the Von Bondies, Reba Fritz, Destroy All Monsters, Jenny Toomey, Slumber Party, John Sinclair, Elizabeth Mitchell, and Lisa Loeb, as well as HNIA offshoot Velour 100.

Defever was raised in a strict religious household, along with his brothers, Johnny and Matt. He grew up a music fan. His grandfather was a musician from Saskatchewan and had taught Warren and his brothers how to play various musical instruments. 

Defever began recording while still in high school, and toured as the bassist of psychobilly rock band Elvis Hitler. 

For many years, Defever recorded in the basement of his parents' house, which he later bought from them. 

Around the same time His Name Is Alive was departing from 4AD Records, Defever opened his own recording studio, Brown Rice, in the Detroit area. Along with Davin Brainard, Defever runs a home record label, timeSTEREO.

In 2007, Defever opened The UFO Factory, a new studio in Detroit. Everything inside was painted silver, including the piano.

References

External links
timeSTEREO
His Name Is Alive
UFO FACTORY

1969 births
Living people
Eastern Michigan University alumni
Musicians from Detroit
People from Livonia, Michigan
Record producers from Michigan